Clyde Walter Ehrhardt (July 4, 1921 – February 5, 1963) was an American football center in the National Football League (NFL) for the Washington Redskins.  He played college football at the University of Georgia and was selected in the 19th round of the 1944 NFL Draft.  He served as the head football coach at Presbyterian College in 1962.

Early life
Ehrhardt was born in Bardwell, Kentucky, and was the son of a Baptist minister who served pastorates in Kentucky and Tennessee.  He attended Morgan Prep School in Petersburg, Tennessee.

College career
Ehrhardt attended and played college football at the University of Georgia in Athens, Georgia.  While at Georgia, he was part of the team that won the 1942 Orange Bowl, which was Georgia's first bowl appearance and first win.  The following year, they won the 1943 Rose Bowl.  Ehrhardt graduated from Georgia in 1943 and earned a master's degree from Peabody College in 1954.

Military career
After graduating from college, Ehrhardt served in the United States Army as a company commander in Europe during World War II, during which he earned high decorations for valor and was twice seriously wounded.  He then served on the staff of the Eighth United States Army during the Korean War as an intelligence officer.

Professional football career

Player
Ehrhardt was selected in the 19th round of the 1944 NFL Draft by the Washington Redskins, where he played in 1946, 1948 and 1949.  In 34 games, he had three interceptions and three fumble recoveries.

Coach
After retiring from playing football, Ehrhardt became a football coach at Decatur High School in Decatur, Georgia, where he also taught math, physical education, and was the assistant principal.  He became an assistant head coach in 1957 at Presbyterian College under head coach Frank Jones.  In 1962, he succeeded Jones as head coach.

Death
Ehrhardt died on February 5, 1963, from an accidental self-inflicted gunshot wound while on a hunting trip.

Head coaching record

College

References

External links

 

1921 births
1963 deaths
American football centers
Georgia Bulldogs football players
Presbyterian Blue Hose athletic directors
Presbyterian Blue Hose football coaches
Washington Redskins players
High school football coaches in Georgia (U.S. state)
United States Army personnel of the Korean War
United States Army personnel of World War II
United States Army officers
People from Bardwell, Kentucky
Coaches of American football from Kentucky
Players of American football from Kentucky
Accidental deaths in South Carolina
Firearm accident victims in the United States
Deaths by firearm in South Carolina
Hunting accident deaths